Edvard Hultgren (24 January 1904 – 26 April 1984) was a Swedish boxer who competed in the 1924 Summer Olympics. In 1924 he was eliminated in the first round of the welterweight class after losing his fight to the upcoming bronze medalist Douglas Lewis.

References

External links
profile

1904 births
1984 deaths
Welterweight boxers
Olympic boxers of Sweden
Boxers at the 1924 Summer Olympics
Swedish male boxers
20th-century Swedish people